Joachim Feller (30 November 1638 – 15 April 1691) was a German professor at the University of Leipzig and from 1675 head of its university library.

He was born at Zwickau and died in Leipzig.

Sources 
 Reinhard Breymayer (ed.): Luctuosa desideria. Wiedergefundene Gedenkschriften auf den Leipziger pietistischen Studenten Martin Born (1666 – 1689). Mit Gedichten von Joachim Feller, August Hermann Francke und anderen. Teil 1. Luctuosa desideria und Vetterliche und Freund-verbundene Letzte Pflicht. Text. 1. Auflage, Noûs-Verlag Thomas Leon Heck, Tübingen 2008. .   
 Reinhard Breymayer / Red[aktion]: Feller, Joachim, auch: Cholander, Franciscus Dermasius. In Walther Killy Killy Literaturlexikon. Autoren und Werke des deutschsprachigen Kulturraumes. 2., vollständig überarb. Auflage, Vol. 3. Berlin, New York: Walter de Gruyter & Co. (2008), . .

1638 births
1691 deaths
German librarians
People from Zwickau
Academic staff of Leipzig University
German male writers